Arthur Johansen (13 August 1904 – 11 January 1984) was a Norwegian footballer. He played in three matches for the Norway national football team from 1930 to 1931.

References

External links
 

1904 births
1984 deaths
Norwegian footballers
Norway international footballers
Place of birth missing
Association footballers not categorized by position